Billy Lunn may refer to:

Billy Lunn, musician in The Subways
Billy Lunn (footballer)

See also
William Lunn (disambiguation)